The Duke of Aleria (German:Der Herzog von Aleria) is a 1923 German silent film directed by Heinz Schall and starring Johannes Riemann, Lina Lossen and Erich Kaiser-Titz.

The film's art direction was by Karl Machus.

Cast
 Johannes Riemann as Herzog Vinzenz von Aleria  
 Lina Lossen as Herzogin Maria 
 Erich Kaiser-Titz as Herms van Rosen  
 Philipp Manning as Prälat Ruspoli  
 Claire Rommer as Dolan Fay 
 Yuri Yurovsky as Hausarzt Dr. Antony 
 Johanna Zimmermann as Dita Roland

References

External links

1923 films
Films of the Weimar Republic
Films directed by Heinz Schall
German silent feature films
German black-and-white films